Clayton Cecil 'Chick' Donnelley (1923–1998) was an Australian rugby league footballer who played in the 1940s.

Originally a La Perouse junior, 'Chick' Donnelley was graded at St George Dragons in the mid 1940s. A big raw-boned lock-forward, 'Chick' Donnelley played two years of first grade with St George between 1946-1947. He featured in the 1946 Grand Final team that was defeated by Balmain Tigers 13-12 as the replacement lock forward for the injured Walter Mussing. 

He died on 30 November 1998.

References

St. George Dragons players
Australian rugby league players
1923 births
1998 deaths
Rugby league locks
Rugby league players from Sydney